Kaboodle is a 13-part anthology television series which includes animation, puppetry, and live action and was produced by the Australian Children's Television Foundation (ACTF) that ran on ABC Television from 1987 to 1990.  Kaboodle 2 was a follow-on series which provided another six half-hour episodes of innovative television drama for the under-tens. Kaboodle 2, however, was fully animated and instead of being an ‘anthology’ series of many short dramas, all of which are different, this season had regular characters in every episode. The show commenced screening on the Seven Network across Australia in April 1990.

The original concept was conceived by Jenny Hooks and the series aimed to provide quality Australian television drama for the long neglected 6-9 year old age group. The series intended to stimulate young children’s imagination and widen their range of experiences. Some of the stories are based on distinguished Australian children’s books, some on fairy tales and myths, whilst others have been developed as wholly original work for Kaboodle. The make-believe of television drama, where anything can and should happen, was well suited to foster healthy, emotional and intellectual growth by challenging the imagination and widening the range of children's experience.

Kaboodle is significant-not only because it catered to a much-neglected audience-but also because the series provided industry experience and international screen credit for numerous talented up-and-coming Australian film-makers. More than one hundred crew who worked on Kaboodle gained their first television credit or advanced their careers by working on the series. The series was distributed outside Australia and New Zealand by London and New-York based Richard Price Television Associates Limited. Kaboodle video cassettes were marketed in Australia by CBS/FOX Video.

Crew

Kaboodle 
Executive Producer: Patricia Edgar
Series Producer: Jeff Peck
Concept: Jennifer Hooks
Producers
 Robert Alcock
 Richard Chataway
 Colleen Clarke
 Michael Cusack
 Gary Davis
 John Griffin
 Jenifer Hooks
 Peita Letchford
 Tony Llewellyn-Jones
 John Morris
 Heather Ogilvie
 Mark Osborn
 David Rapsey
 Penny Robins
 Neil Robinson
 Michael Szmanski
 Peter Viska
 Michael Webb
 Timothy White
 Stephanie Wiessner
 Vincent C. Zimbardi
Directors
 Robert Alcock 
 Karin Altmann
 Sue Brooks
 Catherine Campbell
 Richard Chataway 
 Paul Cox
 Michael Cusack
 Gary Davis
 Jessica Douglas-Henry
 Steve French
 Maggie Geddes
 Peita Letchford
 Carl Looper
 Robert Marchand
 Mitch Mathews
 Mark Osborn
 Sue Randall
 Penny Robenstone
 Jan Sardi
 John Skibinski
 Michael Szymanski
 Peter Viska
 Heather Williams
 Vincent C. Zimbardi
Animators
 Richard Chataway
 Michael Cusack
 Steve French
 Ross Gathercole
 Maggie Geddes 
 Peter Green
 Anne Jolliffe
 Penny Robenstone
 Jonathan Rossiter
 John Rossiter
 John Skibinski
 Peter Viska
 Andrew Whisson

Kaboodle 2 
Executive producer: Patricia Edgar
Supervising Producer: Susie Campbell
Writers, Producers and Directors
 Richard Chataway
 Michael Cusack
 Maggie Geddes
 Neil Robinson
 Peter Viska
 Paul Williams
Series Development: Jeff Peck
Animators
 Michael Cusack
 Ian Forss
 Steve French
 Ross Gathercole
 Maggie Geddes
 Peter Green
 Frank Hellard
 Bill Hodge
 Greg Ingram
 Anne Jolliffe
 Paul Marion
 Gus McLaren
 Steve Robinson
 Joe Rossiter
 Paul Williams

Kaboodle Synopsis 
Each half hour episode tells two or three separate stories using a variety of forms including animation, puppetry, and live action. It was a kaleidoscope of forms, with each episode varying in pace, length and mood. It aimed to provide laughs and tears, fantasy and realism, but specifically tailored to the interests of the young viewer (6-9 year olds). There were thirty-two separate short stories included in the thirteen-part series.

The Short stories

Kaboodle 2 Synopsis 
Kaboodle 2 contained four regular drama segments as part of its fully animated 6 half hour mini-series:

 "Echidna Crossing" animated by Maggie Geddes and Neil Robinson
 "The Dream Machine" animated by Paul Williams
 "The Hedge and Mr Snip" animated by Peter Viska
 "The Great Detective" animated by Michael Cusack and Richard Chataway

Series production 
The series was produced by the Foundation with Patricia Edgar as Executive Producer and Jeff Peck as Series Producer. It went into production backed by Film Victoria, ABC-TV, the Australian Film Commission and the ACTF. It was the first time these companies came together to fund a children’s television series.

Segments for the series were produced by some of Australia's most experienced filmmakers, as well as some of the most promising new talent on the film and television scene at the time, including many children who were getting their first television acting experience. Scores of people helped make Kaboodle a diverse and interesting event in the 1987 broadcast schedule, when it was shown on the ABC.

Kaboodle

1985
In an effort to help give Kaboodle the freshness and vitality needed in an innovative series, the Foundation offered a prize of $1,000 to the student at the Australian Film and Television School and the Film and Television Department at the Swinburne Institute of Technology respectively who submitted the best idea for a Kaboodle story. Winners of the 1985 contest were Alan Love and John Taylor. Love proposed a 10-minute film featuring live action and puppetry titled ‘Scuff and Rebecca”, a fantasy story of a boy and his sock puppets that come to life. Taylor won his prize for his script of ‘The Huge Adventures of Trevor A Cat”, a humorous story about a cat with an ever-increasing appetite, which also received a grant from the Australian Film Commission’s Comedy Fund.

Four other film and television students also had concepts included in Kaboodle. From the Australian Film and Television school, Jennifer Mellet who wrote “The Marvellous Adventures of Miriam and the Miraculous Miranda” (live action and computer animation) and Cate Cahill who wrote “Talo’s Story” (computer animation). From Swinburne, Penny Robenstone wrote “Joshua Cooks” (animation) and Mark Osborn wrote “The Fogbrook Thing” (live action).

1986
Production commenced in June 1986 and was undertaken in Sydney, Melbourne, Adelaide and Perth.

Paul Cox, one of Australia’s leading directors joined the Kaboodle production team. He wrote and directed a twenty minute drama about a little girl’s adventure when she is led by tree gnomes deep into the mysterious caverns below the massive pine and gum trees in her back yard. Entitled ‘The Secret Life of Trees’ Paul originally wrote it as a fairy-tale for his daughter.

Kaboodle 2 
In June 1988, Kaboodle 2, the follow-on series to the critically acclaimed Kaboodle, was up and running and backed by the Foundation, Film Victoria, the Australian Film Commission, and the South Australian Film Industry Advisory Committee.

Production began July 1988 and was completed June 1989.

History

Launch 
Kaboodle was officially launched by the Minister for the Environment and the Arts, Senator, The Hon. Graham Richardson, at the Menzies at Rialto Hotel in Melbourne on Thursday 15 October 1987. Members of the ABC, Film Victoria, CBS/FOX Video, the media, Kaboodle writers, producers and directors and other members of the film and television industry attended the launch.

Accompanying Books

Kaboodle
To accompany the series, four hard cover picture books were published by ABC Enterprises. The picture books were “The Secret Life of Trees”, “The Wheelie Wonder”, “Molly Makes Music” and “Lock Up Your Toys”. The paperbacks included “The Wizards of Solmar”, “Talo’s Story” and “The Kobold and Potato” in one book, with “Double Take”, “Scuff the Sock” and “The Birthday present” in the other.

Kaboodle 2
Four books were published by Hodder & Stoughton to accompany the Kaboodle 2 series: "Hedge Island", "The Great Detective and the Case of Captain Blunderbuss’s Secret", "Grandfather’s Dream Machine" and "Echidna Crossing".

Thomas Nelson Australia packaged and marketed an educational package containing the picture story books, videotapes and Kaboodle 2 Teacher’s Notes to schools.

Re-screens 
In July 1988, Kaboodle was re-screened by the ABC.

Kaboodle 1 was re-screened again by the ABC in November 1989 nationally.

Kaboodle re-screened nationally on the ABC, as part of their programming for schools in July on 1990.

Kaboodle 2 was re-screened on the Seven Network across Australia from 6 July 1991.

Success and Reach 
CBS/FOX Video released six Kaboodle video-cassettes in November 1987 and by 30 June 1988, more than 5000 videocassettes had been sold.

On 30 June 1990 CBS/FOX Video reported sales of 6,457 Kaboodle videotapes and The Foundation reported sales of 972 Kaboodle Teacher’s Notes.

Kaboodle 2 was promoted at MIPCOM in October 1989. As a direct result sales were achieved in the following territories: UK, Israel, Singapore and as part of a package distribution arrangement to Spain, Portugal, Albania, Bulgaria, Czechoslovakia, Hungary, Poland, Romania, USSR, Yugoslavia, Africa, Ireland, Greece and Belgium.

By 1991, Both Kaboodle 1 and 2 had been sold into Gibraltar, Iceland, Saudi Arabia and the United Kingdom.

In June 1991, Festival Video reported sales of 2,017 Kaboodle 2 videotapes; Hodder & Stoughton reported sales of 17,584 Kaboodle 2 books; Thomas Nelson reported sales of 110 Kaboodle 2 Teacher’s Notes.

By 1992, both series had been sold into Zimbabwe, Portugal and Greece.

Awards and nominations

Reviews 
Kaboodle screened on ABC Television, Australia wide at 4:30 pm weekdays for 13 afternoons from Monday 26 October. The response to the show from critics and the public was terrific.

 “Kaboodle is full of joy, delight, fantasy and beauty, nothing like the sort of thing nosily hurled at children’s eyes in early morning or late afternoon cartoon sessions…my six year old watches Kaboodle smiling and chattering, a good sign in this viewer.” The Age, Melbourne, 14/11/87
 “Kaboodle is a fascinating concept and refreshingly different” The Daily Telegraph, Sydney, 25/10/87
 “The show offers a veritable melting pot for them to consider” The Daily Mirror, Sydney, 26/10/87
 “Kaboodle, the idea of the ACTF, is a veritable smorgasbord of everything kids (and big kids) like to watch-comedy, adventure, fantasy and realism” The Daily Sun, Brisbane, 26/10/87
"Those who financed this venture have used our taxes so well that we can only hope there will be more series as good as this" The Age, Melbourne, 14/11/87
"Just when you thought children's TV had reached rock bottom, along comes Kaboodle", "This innovative 13-part anthology, produced by the ACTF, widens the horizons of TV viewers under 10 with a smorgasbord of home-grown comedy, adventure, fantasy and realism", "It's fun, it's stimulating and refreshingly different" Sunday Observer, Melbourne, 25/10/87
"Kids and Kaboodle go together! No, we don't mean the general mess and chaos which accompanies busy children, but a new television series", "Kaboodle, produced by the ACTF, goes to air for the first time this week, bringing some welcome light to the children's television scene" The Weekly Times, Melbourne, 21/10/87
"Kaboodle is an excellent demonstration of the capabilities of Australian animators too, whose work is usually confined to the world of TV advertising" The Sunday telegraph, 25/10/87
"Kaboodle is a wonderful concept and will hopefully give our children something other than American cartoons, many of which were made some 30 years ago" The Sunday Observer, Melbourne, 18/10/87
"Kaboodle uses a unique blend of styles and moods to offer an entertaining and unusual series for young children" The Advocate, Tasmania, 26/10/87
"It's the first special television for young children ever made in this country, and it serves for them what we adults require of our programs-it reflects their lives, it's high quality, and it's very entertaining", "Kaboodle is a magic box of superb offerings collected by the ACTF. It's an anthology of terrific stories from some of our brightest and best and sometimes youngest filmmakers" Parents & Children, Australia, Oct/Nov 1987

References

1987 Australian television series debuts
1990 Australian television series endings
Australian children's television series
Australian Broadcasting Corporation original programming
Seven Network original programming
Australian anthology television series
Australian television shows featuring puppetry
Stop-motion animated television series